Yi Ja-heung or Lee Ja-hŭng (born 1305), posthumously honoured as Grand Prince Wanchang was a nobleman who served as the 2nd rank official (좌윤, 左尹; Jwayun) during the Later Goryeo dynasty periods and eventually became the part of the Joseon Royal family member as the first and oldest son of Yi Chun. He was the only full older brother of Yi Jachun, which he became the paternal uncle of Yi Seonggye, its founder.

He studied in Yeokdong (역동, 易東) as one of U Tak (우탁, 禹倬)'s student. In Yuan dynasty, Yi served as one of the government official (천호, 千戶) in there. After his nephew, Yi Seong-gye (이성계) established the new dynasty, Yi Ja-heung served his nephew as Taejo's military officer (병조판서, 兵曹判書) and on 9 March 1871, Yi was given Posthumous name Jeonggan (정간, 貞簡). In 1872, Emperor Gojong of Korea gave him a posthumous name as Grand Prince Wanchang (완창대군, 完昌大君) and was enshrined in Yeongjongjeonggyeong (영종정경, 領宗正卿) alongside his parents. Their tomb located at Gwiju-dong, Hamheung.

References

External links
Grand Prince Wanchang on Naver .
Grand Prince Wanchang .

Korean princes
1305 births
Year of death unknown
14th-century Korean people